Wanda Piłsudska (7 February 1918 – 16 January 2001) was a daughter of Józef Piłsudski, and a psychiatrist by profession.

Life

Wanda Piłsudska, of the Piłsudski coat of arms, was the elder daughter of Józef Piłsudski and Aleksandra Szczerbińska. She spent her youth mainly in Warsaw, living with her family at the Belweder Palace, and in Sulejówek at the cottage of Milusin, which Piłsudski had received as a gift from his soldiers.

In September 1939, together with her mother and younger sister Jadwiga Piłsudska, Wanda was evacuated by special aeroplane via Sweden to the United Kingdom of Great Britain and Northern Ireland.  She studied medicine in Edinburgh, then practiced psychiatry at a Polish hospital outside London.  She also worked with the Józef Piłsudski Institute in London.

In the autumn of 1990, Wanda returned for good to Poland.  In November 2000 she regained the family cottage in Sulejówek, where she planned to create a museum dedicated to her father, Józef Piłsudski.

Wanda Piłsudska died, after a protracted illness, in Warsaw on 16 January 2001. She willed her entire estate for the establishment of a museum honouring Józef Piłsudski.

See also
Józef Piłsudski
Bronisław Piłsudski (1866–1918)
Jadwiga Piłsudska
Piłsudski (family)
Kasztanka

References

1918 births
2001 deaths
Physicians from Warsaw
Józef Piłsudski
Polish psychiatrists
Polish women psychiatrists
Women physicians
Alumni of the University of Edinburgh
Children of national leaders